
Year 880 (DCCCLXXX) was a leap year starting on Friday (link will display the full calendar) of the Julian calendar.

Events 
 By place 

 Byzantine Empire 
 Battle of Cephalonia: A Byzantine fleet, under Admiral Nasar, is sent by Emperor Basil I to the Ionian Islands. Nasar defeats the Aghlabids in a night battle near Cephalonia (modern Greece).
 May 1 – The Nea Ekklesia is inaugurated in Constantinople, by Patriarch Photius I, setting the model for all later cross-in-square Orthodox churches.Ousterhout (2007), p. 34.

 Europe 
 February 2 – Battle of Lüneburg Heath: King Louis III is defeated by the Norse Great Heathen Army at Lüneburg Heath. The Saxons are routed in a snowstorm; many drown in the river or are captured during the retreat.  
 Battle of Thimeon: King Louis III ("the Younger") defeats Vikings (probably Norsemen) from England, near Charleroi, north of the River Sambre. During the battle 5,000 Vikings are killed. 
 Battle of Fjaler: King Harald Fairhair moves east along the Norwegian coast with his fleet. He defeats his rival Atle Mjove at Fjaler in Sunnfjord, and lands with his longships at Tønsberg.
 December – Treaty of Ribemont: Louis the Younger and the kings of the West Frankish Kingdom sign a treaty. The young Frankish monarch, Louis III, is reduced to merely Neustria. 
 Lambert I, duke of Spoleto, dies while besieging the city of Capua. He is succeeded by his son Guy II. 
 The oldest known mention is made of the city of Dortmund (approximate date).

 Asia 
 Fujiwara no Mototsune, Japanese statesman, creates the position of regent (kampaku) for himself. The Fujiwara clan will be able to dominate the government for more than 3 centuries.
 December 22 – Luoyang, eastern Chinese capital of the  Dynasty, is captured by rebel leader Huang Chao, during the reign of emperor Xi Zong.

 By topic 

 Religion 
 Pope John VIII issues the bull Industriae Tuae, creating an independent ecclesiastical province in Great Moravia, with archbishop Methodius as its head. Old Church Slavonic is recognized as the fourth liturgical language, besides Latin, Greek and Hebrew.
 The first known Christian bishopric in Slovakia is established in the city of Nitra, with Wiching as bishop.

Births 
 Æthelweard, son of Alfred the Great (approximate date)
 Abu Bakr ibn Yahya al-Suli, Muslim poet and scholar (d. 946)
 Béatrice of Vermandois, Frankish queen (approximate date)
 Bernard the Dane, Viking nobleman (earl) (approximate date)
 Fujiwara no Tadahira, Japanese statesman and regent (d. 949)
 Gagik I of Vaspurakan, Armenian king (approximate date)
 Hugh of Arles, king of Italy and Lower Burgundy (or 881)
 Hywel ap Cadell, king of Deheubarth (Wales) (approximate date)
 Lambert II, co-ruler and king of Italy (approximate date)
 Louis the Blind, Frankish king and Holy Roman Emperor (d. 928)
 Rudolph II, Burgundian king and Holy Roman Emperor (d. 937)
 Sinan ibn Thabit, Muslim physician (d. 943)

Deaths 
 February 2 – Bruno, duke of Saxony
 March 22 – Carloman of Bavaria, Frankish king 
 Ansgarde of Burgundy, Frankish queen (or 882)
 Ariwara no Narihira, Japanese waka poet (b. 825)
 Guaifer of Salerno, Lombard prince
 Hugh of Saxony, illegitimate son of Louis the Younger
 Fatima al-Fihri, Arab university founder
 Lambert I, duke of Spoleto (approximate date)
 Lothar I, Frankish nobleman (b. 840)
 Sugawara no Koreyoshi, Japanese nobleman (b. 812)

References